The Uppsala River Rafting Event is an  event organized in Uppsala, Sweden on the Fyris River at the end of April each year.

Started in 1975, the event is organized by the Uppsala Union of Engineering and Science Students (UTN).

The River Rafting 
The rafting takes place  on 30 April every year, Walpurgis Night. Normally about 100 participants float the Haglund bridge in Uppsala to Islandsfallet in home-built polystyrene rafts. Upwards of 30,000 spectators may watch the event. The prizes are awarded by the principal of the university, the Rector Magnificus.

A few of the rafts represent different organizations but the vast majority of the participants are students at the University of Uppsala or other universities

The River Festival 
The River Festival, which takes place during the preceding week, allows participants to build their rafts in the raft-construction area,. During the daytime, there are a number of activities and in the evenings different themed pubs, parties and performances. The night before the rafting event is known as Kvalborg (qualifying night).

The Rafting committee 
The Rafting committee organizes both the River Rafting and the Rafting Festival. The committee is selected once a year and consists of 23 volunteers who are students at the Department of Engineering and Science. The members of the committee are recognisable by their red tops and black carpenter's trousers with flames licking up their legs.

References

External links 
 Pictures from the River Rafting in Uppsala
 The River Rafting
 Pictures from the River Rafting 2007
 Pictures from the River Rafting 2010

Rafting
Raft races
Annual events in Sweden
Uppsala University
Water sports in Sweden